Finnish Cup 2009 was the 55th season of the main annual football (soccer) cup competition in Finland. It is organized as a single-elimination knock–out tournament.

Participation in the competition is voluntary. Veikkausliiga side IFK Mariehamn, for example, decided not to register for the tournament, as well as some Ykkönen teams.

A total of 356 teams registered for the competition. They entered in different rounds, depending on their position within the league system. Clubs with teams in Kolmonen (level IV) or an inferior league, as well as Veterans and Junior teams, started the competition in Round 1. Teams from Ykkönen (level II) and Kakkonen (level III) entered in Round 4. Veikkausliiga clubs started in Round 5 with the exception of Inter Turku, FC Honka, FC Lahti and HJK Helsinki. These four teams entered in Round 6 because they qualified for European competitions after the 2008 season.

The tournament started on 28 March 2009 with the First Round and concluded with the Final on 31 October 2009 at Finnair Stadium, Helsinki. Inter Turku defeated Tampere United 2–1, giving them a place in the second qualifying round of the 2010–11 UEFA Europa League. They have since been promoted to the third qualifying round because Atlético Madrid, winners of the 2009–10 UEFA Europa League, are now assured of qualifying domestically for the 2010–11 Europa League, either as winners of the 2009–10 Copa del Rey or losing finalists to a Champions League-qualified Sevilla.

Round 1
The draw for this round was conducted on 12 March 2008. 102 teams were drawn into 51 matches for this round. 213 teams received a bye into the next round. The matches were played between 28 March and 14 April 2009.

Round 2
The draw for this round was conducted on 12 March 2009. The 51 winners of the First Round, along with 213 teams who received a bye, were drawn into 132 matches for this round. The matches were played between 2–24 April 2009.

Round 3
The draw for this round was conducted on 16 April 2009. The 132 winners of the Second Round were drawn into 66 matches for this round. The matches were played between 25 April–3 May 2009.

Round 4
This round included the 66 winners from the previous round and the 28 clubs from the Ykkönen 2009 and Kakkonen 2009 seasons that entered into the competition. These clubs were drawn into 47 matches that took place between 5 and 26 May 2009.

Round 5
This round included the 47 winners of the previous round and the 9 Veikkausliiga 2009 clubs that entered this competition who were not involved in European competitions for the 2009-10 cycle. This included all the clubs in the league competition except for Inter Turku, FC Honka, FC Lahti and HJK Helsinki, who entered the competition in the round following this one, and IFK Mariehamn who decided not to participate in this competition. These 28 matches were played between 1 and 12 June 2009.

Round 6
This round included the 28 winners from the previous round and the 4 Veikkausliiga 2009 clubs involved in European competition in the 2009-10 cycle: Inter Turku, FC Honka, FC Lahti and HJK Helsinki. These matches were played on 8 and 9 July 2009 except for the match between FC Viikingit and FC Lahti, which took place on August 12 due to Lahti's involvement in the Europa League.

Round 7
This round included the 16 winners of the previous round. These matches were played on 29 and 30 August 2009.

Quarter-finals
This round included the eight winners from the previous round.

Semi-finals
This round included the four quarter-final winners.

Final
The two semi-final winners participated in this match.

References

External links
 Official page 
 suomencup.net 

Finnish Cup seasons
Finnish Cup
Cup